The Schirmbach  is a small river of Saxony, Germany. It flows into the Striegis in Wegefarth.

See also
List of rivers of Saxony

Rivers of Saxony
Freiberg
Rivers of Germany